Susan Naqin (also Romanized as Sūsan Naqīn; also known as Sūsan Naqī, Sūsan Qīn, Sūseh Naqī, and Susnaqīn) is a village in Shahsavan Kandi Rural District, in the Central District of Saveh County, Markazi Province, Iran. At the 2006 census, its population was 126, in 44 families.

References 

Populated places in Saveh County